Evangelos Ioannis Delakas (born 8 February 1985) is a retired Greek water polo player and the current assistant coach of Greek powerhouse Olympiacos. As a player, Delakas won a bronze medal at the 2015 World Championships and competed at the 2012 and 2016 Olympics. He played for Olympiacos for 14 years (2004–2018) and won 12 Greek Championships, 11 Greek Cups and the 2017–18 LEN Champions League with the club.

Apart from water polo, Delakas runs an art gallery in Kolonaki, together with his wife Fay and his father-in-law.

See also
 List of World Aquatics Championships medalists in water polo

References

External links
 

Greek male water polo players
1985 births
Living people
Olympiacos Water Polo Club players
Olympic water polo players of Greece
Water polo players at the 2012 Summer Olympics
Water polo players at the 2016 Summer Olympics
World Aquatics Championships medalists in water polo
Mediterranean Games medalists in water polo
Mediterranean Games bronze medalists for Greece
Competitors at the 2013 Mediterranean Games
Water polo players from Athens